The Revmaster R-2300 is a 4 stroke aircraft engine for Homebuilt aircraft

Design and development
The engine is based on the Volkswagen air-cooled engine. It is extensively modified for aircraft use. This modification consists of a quad CDI ignition (8 coils), new and enlarged #4 bearing, custom made crank shaft and cam shaft, custom made cylinder heads and other modifications. The engine is delivered completely assembled and test run from the factory (it is not delivered as a kit).

Applications
Thatcher CX5
Sonex Aircraft Onex

Specifications (variant)

References

External links
 http://www.revmasteraviation.com/

2010s aircraft piston engines